Wonderland was an amusement park that operated in the Longfellow neighborhood of Minneapolis from 1905 through 1911. The ten-acre site was located between Lake Street and 32nd Street and 31st and 33rd Avenues.

Attractions
A 120-foot tower, lit by thousands of electric lights, was Wonderland's focal point and could be seen from a distance of five miles. Among the other attractions were a scenic railway (roller coaster), old mill, carousel and house of nonsense.  After the park's demise, some of its rides ended up at Excelsior Amusement Park on Lake Minnetonka. The aerial swing, however, was purchased by Marion Savage for use at Antlers Park in Lakeville.

One of the park’s most popular features was the "Infant Incubator Institute", whose owner, Dr. Martin A. Couney, had similar exhibits at amusement parks and expositions throughout the country and in Europe.  The hospital, the only remaining structure from Wonderland, is now an apartment building at the intersection of 31st Avenue and 31st Street.

Lawsuit
In 1905 Elim Presbyterian Church sued Wonderland in an effort to close the park down. Elim, on the northwest corner of 32nd Avenue and Lake Street, was opposite Wonderland’s main entrance.  It argued that the park's crowds and noise interfered with worship services.  The case was settled out of court, and the owners of Wonderland had the church moved to land they had purchased at 33rd Street and 30th Avenue.  The congregation, later known as Vanderburgh Presbyterian Church, continued at that location for decades, and a house of worship is found there still.

Gallery

See also
Trolley park

References

External links 
Wonderland at Placeography.
Wonderland at the Internet Archive.
Articles
Transcriptions
Historic American Newspapers
"New and Varied Thrills to be on Tap in Wonderland"  The Minneapolis Journal, May 13, 1905
"New Amusement Park is Thrown Open to Inspection" The Minneapolis Tribune, May 15, 1905
"The Incubator Babies at Wonderland Park" The Minneapolis Journal, May 20, 1905

Amusement parks in Minnesota
Defunct amusement parks in Minnesota
1905 establishments in Minnesota
1911 disestablishments in Minnesota